The High Commission of Sri Lanka in Ottawa is the diplomatic mission of Sri Lanka to Canada. The current High Commissioner is Asoka Girihagama.

High Commissioners

References

External links
 

Canada–Sri Lanka relations
Sri Lanka
Ottawa